Agustín Cotorruelo Sendagorta (13 July 1925 – 6 February 1989) was a Spanish politician who served as Minister of Trade of Spain in 1973, during the Francoist dictatorship.

References

1925 births
1989 deaths
Economy and finance ministers of Spain
Government ministers during the Francoist dictatorship